The 2019–20 season was ATK's sixth season since its establishment in 2014 and their sixth season in the Indian Super League. The 2019–20 season was ATK's last season before it got dissolved.

Pre-season and friendlies

Competitions

Indian Super League

League table

Results by matchday

Fixtures

League stage

Playoffs

Players

Squad

Other players under contract

Out on loan

Season statistics

Scoring

Top scorers

References

ATK (football club) seasons
ATK